Sursa is a village and corresponding community development block in Hardoi district of Uttar Pradesh, India. Located 14 or 15 km from the city of Hardoi, the village hosts a market on Mondays and Thursdays. The village has two primary schools and one clinic. As of 2011, the population of Sursa is 2,157, in 373 households.

Demographic history 
The 1961 census recorded Sursa as comprising 1 hamlet, with a total population of 818 (431 male and 387 female), in 174 households and 127 physical houses. The area of the village was given as 636 acres.

The 1981 census recorded Sursa as having a population of 1,269, in 256 households, and covering an area of 257.39 hectares.

Villages 
Sursa CD block has the following 83 villages:

References 

Villages in Hardoi district